Bach Choir, Bach-Chor or Bachchor is the name of a number of organizations named after Johann Sebastian Bach, often performing his choral music exclusively, predominantly, or historically. Such organizations include:

Canada 
 Ottawa Bach Choir
 Bach-Elgar Choir, Hamilton, Ontario

Germany 
 Bach-Chor Bonn
 Münchener Bach-Chor
 Bachchor Stuttgart
 Bachchor Wiesbaden

Switzerland
 Berner Bach-Chor, Bern
 Zürcher Bach Chor, Zurich

United Kingdom 
 The Bach Choir, London
 Aberdeen Bach Choir
 Bath Bach Choir
 Birmingham Bach Choir

 Bristol Bach Choir
 Bury Bach Choir, founded by Percy Hallam in 1932

 Derby Bach Choir, founded by Wallace Michael Ross in 1969
 Dorset Bach Cantata Club

 Oxford Bach Choir

 St Albans Bach Choir
 Sheffield Bach Choir

United States 
 Bach Choir of Bethlehem, Pennsylvania

 Phoenix Chorale, formerly the Phoenix Bach Choir, Arizona

Other countries 
 Chamber Philharmonic Taipei, and Bach Choir

See also 

 Bach Collegium Japan

 
Johann Sebastian Bach